Simen Kind Mikalsen (born 5 April 1992) is a Norwegian football defender who currently plays for Lillestrøm.

Career statistics

References

1993 births
Living people
Norwegian footballers
Ullensaker/Kisa IL players
Lillestrøm SK players
Eliteserien players
Norwegian First Division players
People from Jessheim
Association football defenders
Sportspeople from Viken (county)